was a  after Kyōwa and before Bunsei. The period spanned the years from January 1804 to April 1818.

Change of era
 February 11, 1804:  The new era name of Bunka ( meaning "Culture" or "Civilization") was created to mark the start of a new 60-year cycle of the Heavenly Stem and Earthly Branch system of the Chinese calendar which was on New Year's Day, the new moon day of 2 November 1804. The previous era ended and a new one commenced in Kyōwa 4.

Events of the Bunka era
 1804 (Bunka 1): Daigaku-no-kami Hayashi Jussai (1768–1841) explained the shogunate foreign policy to Emperor Kōkaku in Kyoto.
 June 1805 (Bunka 2): Genpaku Sugita (1733–1817) is granted an audience with Shōgun Ienari to explain differences between traditional medical knowledge and Western medical knowledge.
 September 25, 1810 (Bunka 7, 27th day of the 8thmonth): Earthquake in northern Honshū (Latitude: 39.900/Longitude: 139.900), 6.6 magnitude on the Surface wave magnitude scale....Click link for NOAA/Japan: Significant Earthquake Database 		
 December 7, 1812 (Bunka 9, 4th day of the 11th month): Earthquake in Honshū (Latitude: 35.400/Longitude: 139.600), 6.6 magnitude.
 1817 (Bunka 14): Emperor Kōkaku travelled in procession to Sento Imperial Palace, a palace of an abdicated emperor. The Sento Palace at that time was called Sakura Machi Palace. It had been built by the Tokugawa Shogunate for former-Emperor Go-Mizunoo.

Notes

References
 Cullen, Louis M. (2003). A History of Japan, 1582–1941: Internal and External Worlds. Cambridge: Cambridge University Press. ; ;  OCLC 50694793
 Nussbaum, Louis Frédéric and Käthe Roth. (2005). Japan Encyclopedia. Cambridge: Harvard University Press. ; OCLC 48943301
 Sugita Genpaku. (1930). . Tokyo: Iwanami Shoten. OCLC  9424185

External links
 National Diet Library, "The Japanese Calendar" -- historical overview plus illustrative images from library's collection
 National Archives of Japan: Sakuramachiden Gyokozu, scroll depicting Emperor Kōkaku in formal procession, 1817 (Bunka 14).

Japanese eras
1800s in Japan
1810s in Japan